The Photogram (1894–1920) was a photography magazine published in the United Kingdom with an edition printed in America.

The publication
The two founders of The Photogram were Henry Snowden Ward and the significant American feminist photographer Catharine Weed Barnes who married in 1893. She, who was born in Albany, had become a photographer in 1886 and in 1890 became an editor of American Amateur Photographer magazine, contributing a column entitled 'Women's Work'. He was born in Bradford, where by 1884 he was working with Percy Lund & Co., and for them in 1890 launched and edited The Practical Photographer, which he left when together the couple started The Photogram, published in London by Dawbarn and Ward, which continued until 1920.

The couple's punctilious insistence on the term 'photogram' in this title and many of their others was a result of their conviction that the  etymology of 'photography' demanded that the word 'photograph' was the verb, and that the product of the act of photography was the photogram, just as one 'telegraphs' a 'telegram'. From 1906 they appear to have bowed to common usage, renaming The Photogram as The Photographic Monthly; 'Photogram' has since come to mean a camera-less form of photography.

Format and contents
The monthly magazine catered to the advanced amateur and professional and promoted Pictorialism, which was emerging in the 1890s, and art photography, with contributions from by Francis Meadow Sutcliffe, member of The Linked Ring, among other significant authors. Each issue was of about 24 pages measuring about 15 × 23 cm (9 × 6 inches) and a regular feature was a supplement of full-page photographs printed in high quality; it was a little smaller than the pages of its contemporary the British Journal of Photography and other early photographic journals. As an example of the magazine's contents, the March 1895 issue contained articles on Henry Peach Robinson (pp. 65–72)  and a brief biography of Scottish-born J. Traill Taylor FRPS, founder of the Edinburgh Photographic Society and editor of the British Journal of Photography who was to die of dysentery in Florida later that year in November (pp. 57–58). These articles were accompanied by portraits of the two men and reviews of their books; Picture Making by Photography by HP Robinson and Optics of Photography and Photographic Lenses by J Traill Taylor. The picture supplement was devoted to photo-micrographic work by Scottish microbiologist A.H. Baird.

Other titles

The American Photogram
The Photogram was simultaneously published in America as The American Photogram with an American section “with the latest home news" edited there by F.J. Harrison, with its own numbering.

The Process Photogram
Due to Ward’s and Barnes' own interest in the growing industry of photomechanical reproduction, and increasingly, that of a cohort of their readers, they added a small supplement on the technology. By 1896 it had increased in size and was released as a separate trade journal The Process Photogram.

The Photographic Monthly
The Photogram was renamed and continued as The Photographic Monthly after 1906.

The Photogram newsletter
There is an unrelated recent title, also The Photogram, that is the newsletter of the Michigan Photographic Historical Society, published quarterly since 1972.

References

Magazines established in 1894
Magazines disestablished in 1920
Photography magazines
Pictorialism
Defunct magazines published in the United Kingdom